Safiya is an Arab name, meaning "pure." 
Alternative transliterations include Saffiyah, Safiyyah, Safie, Safia, Safija, Safya, Sophie, Safiyah, Safeia, etc.  

Notable bearers of the name include:

Medieval 
Safiyyah bint Abd al-Muttalib (late 560s–c. 640), Sahaba and a prominent person in Islamic history
Safiyya bint Huyayy (c. 610–c. 670), one of the wives of the Islamic prophet Muhammad
Safiyyah bint Abi al-As, daughter of Abu al-As ibn Umayyah
Safiye Sultan (wife of Murad III), Ottoman Valide sultan
Safiye Sultan (daughter of Mustafa II) (1696–1778), the daughter of Ottoman sultan Mustafa II

Modern 
Safiya Zaghloul (1876–1946), Egyptian political activist
Safia Ahmed-jan (1941–2006), Afghan women's rights advocate and critic of the Taliban
Safia Tarzi, Afghan fashion designer.
Safia El Emari (born 1949), Egyptian actress
Sfia Bouarfa (born 1950), Moroccan-Belgian politician
Safiya Henderson-Holmes (1950–2001), African-American poet
Safia Farkash (born 1952), Libyan wife of Muammar Gaddafi
Safia Abdi Haase (born 1959), Somali nurse and women's rights activist
Safia Minney (born 1964), British social entrepreneur and author
Safiya Nygaard (born 1993), American YouTuber
Safia Taleb Ali al-Suhail (born 1965) Iraqi politician
Safia Shah (born 1966), British writer, editor and television news producer
Safiya Hussaini (born 1967), Nigerian condemned to death for adultery, later acquitted
Safia Abukar Hussein (born 1981), Somali sprinter
Safiya Songhai (born 1984), American film director
Safia Boukhima (born 1991) Algerian volleyball player
Siti Safiyah, Malaysian ten-pin bowler
Safiya Abdel Rahman, Egyptian active in girl guiding and scouting

Fictional characters 
 Safiyah Sohail, a DC comics character
 Safie, a character Frankenstein
Safiya fon Hasstrell, a character from Susan Dennard’s Witchlands series

See also
Safiye, Turkish form
Sophia (name) (unrelated Greek name)

References

Arabic feminine given names